Roberta Flack Featuring Donny Hathaway is the ninth studio album by American singer-songwriter Roberta Flack. Released via Atlantic in March 1980, the album features posthumous vocals by close friend and collaborator Donny Hathaway, who had died in 1979. At the 23rd Grammy Awards in 1981, the album was nominated for a Grammy Award for Best Female R&B Vocal Performance. The award, however, went to Stephanie Mills for "Never Knew Love Like This Before."

Overview
Intended as her second duets album with Donny Hathaway (following 1972's Roberta Flack & Donny Hathaway), Flack's ninth studio album project became a Flack solo album with Hathaway as guest due to Hathaway's death after recording only two songs with her. On 13 January 1979 Hathaway and Flack had recorded the duets "Back Together Again" and "You Are My Heaven" - the latter the last song Hathaway would ever record: after having dinner with Flack at her residence in the Dakota, Hathaway had then returned to his suite on the fifteenth floor of Essex House, later fatally falling from the window of his suite.

Despite becoming the first Roberta Flack album since Quiet Fire (1971) to not yield a Top 40 hit, ...Featuring Donny Hathaway provided Flack with a substantial commercial comeback following the underperformance of her precedent 1978 self-titled album, with ...Featuring Donny Hathaway becoming a certified Gold album. Also both the duets on ...Featuring Donny Hathaway reached the R&B chart Top Ten peaking at #8, with "Back Together Again" reaching #3 in the UK: "Back Together Again" had been written by James Mtume and Reggie Lucas, members of Flack's back-up band who had previously written the 1978 Flack/ Hathaway hit "The Closer I Get to You", while "You Are My Heaven" was a Stevie Wonder co-write (with album producer Eric Mercury). Wonder also contributed the song "Don't Make Me Wait Too Long", providing the track's whispered rap: issued as a third single "Don't Make Me Wait..." was not a major mainstream hit, but issued on a 12" single with "Back Together Again" afforded Flack her first disco chart hit single with a #6 peak.

Flack has mentioned the track "Disguises" as being among her favorite lower-profile songs in her repertoire. ...Featuring Donny Hathaway was also the third consecutive Roberta Flack album on which she sang a composition by Michael Masser, who in 1983 would write (with Gerry Goffin) and produce "Tonight, I Celebrate My Love" the million-selling Peabo Bryson duet which would be Flack's most successful post-1970s release.

Track listing

Side One 
"Only Heaven Can Wait (For Love)" (Flack, Eric Mercury) - 4:03
"God Don't Like Ugly" (Gwen Guthrie) - 4:34
"You Are My Heaven" (Eric Mercury, Stevie Wonder) - 4:10
"Disguises" (Stuart Scharf) - 2:24

Side Two 
"Don't Make Me Wait Too Long" (Stevie Wonder) - 7:45
"Back Together Again" (Reggie Lucas, James Mtume) - 9:45
"Stay with Me" (Gerry Goffin, Michael Masser) - 3:47

Personnel 
 Roberta Flack – lead and backing vocals, keyboards, synthesizers, arrangements (1, 2, 4)
 Ray Chew – keyboards, additional horns and strings (6)
 Hubert Eaves III – synthesizers
 Ronnie Foster – synthesizers
 Paul Griffin – keyboards
 Raymond Jones – keyboards
 Ed Walsh – synthesizers
 Harry Whitaker – keyboards
 Stevie Wonder – keyboards (6), drums (6), backing vocals (6)
 Hiram Bullock – guitar
 Reggie Lucas – guitar
 Jeff Mironov – guitar
 John Tropea – guitar
 Eluriel "Tinker" Barfield – bass
 Basil Fearrington – bass
 Anthony Jackson – bass
 Nathan Watts – bass (5)
 Howard King – drums (1-5, 7)
 Errol "Crusher" Bennett – percussion
 Armando Noriega – string arrangements (1, 7)
 Arif Mardin – basic track arrangements (3, 7)
 Paul Riser – string arrangements (5)
 James Mtume – arrangements (6)
 Eric Mercury – backing vocals (1)
 Jocelyn Brown – backing vocals (2, 6)
 Gwen Guthrie – backing vocals (2, 6), BGV arrangements (2, 6)
 Yvonne Lewis – backing vocals (2, 6)
 Merle Miller – backing vocals (2, 6)
 Luther Vandross – backing vocals (2, 6), BGV arrangements (2, 6)
 Brenda White-King – backing vocals (2, 6)
 Revelation – backing vocals (2, 6)
 Donny Hathaway – lead vocals (3, 6)
 Eleanore Mills – backing vocals (3)

Production 
 Roberta Flack – producer (1, 2, 4-7), basic track producer (3), vocal producer (3)
 Eric Mercury – producer (1, 2, 4-7)
 Joe Ferla – co-producer (1, 4)
 Arif Mardin – basic track producer (3), vocal producer (3)
 Howie Lindeman – engineer 
 Joe Lopes – assistant engineer
 Pat Martin – assistant engineer
 Paul Northfield – assistant engineer
 Gary Olazabal – assistant engineer
 Bobby Warner – assistant engineer
 Jack Adelman – mastering 
 Hélène Guertary – cover illustration

External links

References

Roberta Flack albums
Donny Hathaway albums
1979 albums
Atlantic Records albums
Disco albums by American artists
Collaborative albums